Q-type asteroids are relatively uncommon inner-belt asteroids with a strong, broad 1 micrometre olivine and pyroxene feature, and a spectral slope that indicates the presence of metal. There are absorption features shortwards and longwards of 0.7 μm, and the spectrum is generally intermediate between the V and S-type.

Q-type asteroids are spectrally more similar to ordinary chondrite meteorites (types H, L, LL) than any other asteroid type.  This has led scientists to speculate that they are abundant, but only about 20 of this type has been characterized. Examples of Q-type asteroids are: 1862 Apollo, 2102 Tantalus, 3753 Cruithne, 6489 Golevka, and 9969 Braille.

See also
Asteroid spectral types

References 

Asteroid spectral classes